Moelv is a town in Ringsaker Municipality in Innlandet county, Norway. Moelv is the second largest urban area in Ringsaker municipality (after Brumunddal).

Situated at the shores of lake Mjøsa at the mouth of the Moelva river, the town is bordered by green, forested hills farmland. The town consists of a few shopping centers, the Moelv Station along the Dovrebanen railway line, and some pubs and restaurants. The main employer is Moelven Industrier, a manufacturer of specialty building materials.

Archaeological excavations have found traces of human habitation in the area back to the Norwegian Stone Age. In 2010, the urban area of Moelv was granted town status.

The European route E6 used to run through Moelv, but in 1985, the Mjøsa Bridge opened for traffic and since then, the main highway has gone around the town rather than going through it.

The local sports team is Moelven IL.

See also
List of towns and cities in Norway

References

Ringsaker
Cities and towns in Norway
Populated places in Innlandet
2010 establishments in Norway